Mark Jacobson may refer to:
 Mark Jacobson, author of The Lampshade
 Mark Z. Jacobson, professor of civil and environmental engineering

See also
 Mark Jacobsen, Australian international lawn and indoor bowler
 Mark Jacobs (disambiguation)